David James Baxter (15 December 1910 – 2 December 1978) was an Australian rules footballer who played in the Victorian Football League (VFL) between 1934 and 1936 for the Richmond Football Club.

Baxter's son, David Junior, was a member of the Tigers' under-19s 1973 premiership side and his brother-in-law, Leo Merrett, was a member of Richmond's 1943 senior premiership team.

Baxter later served in the Volunteer Defence Corps as part of the Australian Army during World War II.

Footnotes

References
 Hogan P: The Tigers Of Old, Richmond FC, (Melbourne), 1996.

External links 		

Richmond Football Club players
Richmond Football Club Premiership players
Australian rules footballers from Victoria (Australia)
1910 births
1978 deaths
Volunteer Defence Corps soldiers
One-time VFL/AFL Premiership players